is a Japanese politician of the Liberal Democratic Party, a member of the House of Representatives in the Diet (national legislature). A native of Kawanishi, Hyōgo and graduate of Kyoto University, he was elected to the Hyōgo Prefectural Assembly for the first time in 1979 and served six terms. After running unsuccessfully for mayor of Nishinomiya, Hyōgo in 2000, he was elected to the House of Representatives for the first time in 2003.

References

External links 
  in Japanese.

1942 births
Living people
Politicians from Hyōgo Prefecture
Kyoto University alumni
Members of the House of Representatives (Japan)
Liberal Democratic Party (Japan) politicians
Members of the Hyogo Prefectural Assembly
21st-century Japanese politicians